Salvador de Vives Rodó (1784 – 24 November 1845), also known as Salvador Vives, was a Puerto Rican hacendado and Mayor of Ponce, Puerto Rico, from 1 January 1840 to 5 January 1842 and then again from 1 January 1844 to 24 November 1845.  His son, Carlos Vives, was a member of the Ponce Municipal Assembly.

Background
Vives Rodó was the son of Quirse Vives and Ana Maria Rodó. He was a wealthy coffee plantation owner who established the now historic Hacienda Buena Vista.

First mayoral term (1840)
In 1840, Vives named the two central plazas in downtown Ponce "Plaza Las Delicias"; up to that point the two plazas were called Plaza Mayor (which came to be known as Plaza Degetau) and Paseo de la Alameda (which was later renamed Plaza Munoz Rivera).  Also, under Vives' administration as mayor, the Ponce City Hall was built in 1842.  De Vives trusted the design of City Hall to prominent architect Francisco Gil Capó. The trees in Plaza Las Delicias are due to De Vives' direction.

Second mayoral term (1844)
Vives also led the city as mayor from 1 January 1844 until his death on 24 November 1845.

Legacy
One of Ponce's main thoroughfares (Calle Vives) is named after him. "The street was named by proclamation of the city council in 1863."

See also
 List of mayors of Ponce, Puerto Rico
 List of Puerto Ricans

Footnotes

References

1784 births
1845 deaths
Mayors of Ponce, Puerto Rico
Burials at Panteón Nacional Román Baldorioty de Castro
People from Spanish Puerto Rico